The Richmond Free Press is an independent newspaper in Richmond, Virginia. Published on a weekly basis, it is mainly targeted at the city's African-American community and its poorest residents. Raymond H. Boone, its founder, started the paper in part because he felt these groups were underrepresented in the mainstream media.

Raymond H. Boone and Jean Patterson Boone founded the paper in 1992, and Raymond H. Boone served as its editor and publisher until his death on June 3, 2014. Virginia Governor Terry McAuliffe eulogized Boone as “a true Virginia legend”  whose "life devoted to justice, equality and a well-informed public discourse, and I know that commitment will live on thanks to his leadership at the Richmond Free Press.”  Prior to publishing the Richmond Free Press, Boone, who graduated from Boston University with a B.A. in journalism and Howard University with a M.A. in political science, taught journalism at Howard University for almost a decade. Boone was inducted into the Virginia Communications Hall of Fame in 2000, and in 2006, he received the Virginia NAACP’s highest honor, the Oliver W. Hill Freedom Fighter Award.

Jean Patterson Boone took over the role of publisher and president upon her husband's death. Her son, Raymond Boone, Jr. is vice president. Her daughter, Regina Boone, works at the newspaper as a photojournalist. 

The newspaper's coverage of anti-racism and Black Lives Matter protests in Richmond, and in particular, the toppling of Confederate monuments on the city's Monument Avenue, has been highlighted due in part to Richmond's historical status as the former capital of the Confederacy. 

The paper has won honors and awards for excellence in journalism, including awards from the National Newspaper Publishers Association, as well as the Virginia Press Association. Previous journalists have included A. Peter Bailey.

References

External links

Raymond H. Boone Oral History VCU Libraries Digital Collections
The Virginia Civil Rights Movement Virginia Humanities

African-American newspapers
Newspapers published in Virginia
Mass media in Richmond, Virginia
1992 establishments in Virginia